Circular breathing is a technique used by players of some wind instruments to produce a continuous tone without interruption. It is accomplished by breathing  through the nose while simultaneously pushing air  through the mouth using air stored in the cheeks.

History
The technique was developed independently by several cultures and is used for many traditional wind instruments.

In the 13th century, Mongolian metalsmiths who specialized in gold and silver used circular breathing techniques for crafting various decorative and ornamental items. In crafting such items, craftsmen were required to blow continuously to the flame through a pipe with a needle-like hole to make the hard metal melt or soften. From that necessity, craftsmen mastered a circular cycle of breathing by simultaneously inhaling through their noses while they blew without any pauses.

The introduction of the circular breathing technique in the art of ancient windplayers was a productive invention in its performing technique.

Uses

It is used extensively in playing the Eastern zurna, the Mongolian limbe, the Sardinian launeddas, the Egyptian arghul, the Australian didgeridoo, as well as many traditional oboes and flutes of Asia and the Middle East. A few jazz and classical wind and brass players also use some form of circular breathing.

Although many professional wind players find circular breathing highly useful, few pieces of European orchestral music composed before the 20th century actually require its use. However, the advent of circular breathing among professional wind players has allowed for the transcription of pieces originally composed for string instruments which would be unperformable on a wind instrument without the aid of circular breathing. A notable example of this phenomenon is "Moto Perpetuo", transcribed for trumpet by Rafael Méndez from the original work for violin by Paganini.

In 1997, a Guinness World Record was set for longest held musical note.  Kenny G used circular breathing to sustain an E-flat on a saxophone for 45 minutes and 47 seconds. In February 2000, Vann Burchfield set a new Guinness world record for circular breathing, holding one continuous note for 47 minutes, 6 seconds, surpassing Kenny G's record. Mark Atkins on Didgeridoo Concerto (1994) played for over 50 minutes continuously.

On Sunday, 14 May 2017, Nigerian saxophonist Femi Kuti broke Mark Atkins' record by playing for 51 minutes, 38 seconds; after successfully breaking Kenny G's record the previous week.

Method

Performing
The musician fully inhales and begins to exhale and blow outward. When the lungs are nearly empty, the last volume of air is blown into the mouth, and the cheeks are inflated with part of this air. Then, while still blowing this last bit of air out by squeezing the cheeks, the musician must very quickly fill the lungs by inhaling through the nose prior to running out of the air in the mouth. If done correctly, by the time the air in the mouth is nearly exhausted the musician can begin to exhale from the lungs once more, ready to repeat the process again. Essentially, circular breathing bridges the gap between exhalations with air stored in the cheeks, an extra air reserve to play with while sneaking in a breath through the nose.

Learning
The usual first difficulty is to inhale through the nose while blowing out air stored in the cheeks. To some this may be a big hurdle, to others it is no problem at all. This technique may be practiced by holding a finger in front of a thin air stream out of the lips and listening to the wind sound.

The next difficulty is to switch between cheek air and lung air without an unwelcome and uncontrolled jolt in the air pressure; this is achieved by learning to use the cheeks and the throat as a system of shock absorbers. A very simple method by which this is practiced is using a thin straw to blow on to the surface of a cup of water from just above water level, and watching the depression that the air stream creates on the water's surface. The aim is to blow continually and switch between cheek air and lung air without any change in the depth of this depression or groove or hole on the water's surface.

The traditional method of learning in zurna groups is to have one elder player lead as the chanter zurna and asking the younger players to hold the unchanging "drone tone"s. Professional zurna groups may play non-stop for as long as the party lasts, and a drone tone may be held for the whole evening. This is possible thanks to the disk that the lip may lean and rest against, because otherwise, the lip muscles that resist the air pressure get tired first.

Musicians known for circular breathing

Instruments with circular breathing integral to technique 

 Alboka
 Algoze
 Arghul
 Aulos
 Didgeridoo
 Dizi
 Duduk
 Hornpipe
 Kaval
 Kèn bầu
 Khlui
 Launeddas
 Mey
 Mijwiz
 Mizmar
 Pi
 Practice chanter
 Pungi
 Quadruple reed
 Sipsi
 Sralai
 Suling
 Suona
 Zurna
 Clarinet

References

Bibliography 

 Moschner, S. "Circular Breathing: A New Approach".
 Dick, R. Circular Breathing for the Flutist. New York:, 1987
 Dury, S. Die Zirkularatmung auf der Flöte. Frankfurt: Zimmermann, 1992.
 Fischer J. "Vom Traum der Unendlichkeit oder Versuch einer Anleitung zur Zirkularatmung für  Blockflötisten". Tibia (1993). No. 1, pp. 346–35.
 Katchmarschik, V. "Some Mysteries of Ancient Greek Aulets". Journal of the International Double Reed Society (July 1994) No. 22, pp. 93–99. 
 Katschmartschik, W.  "Zur Geschichte und zur  Entstehung  der Methode des 'permanenten  Ausatmen'". Brass Bulletin (1989) No. 67, pp. 32–35.(English, German, French) 
 Katschmartschik, W. "Zur Etwicklungsgeschichte der  Permanentatmung". Tibia (1993), No. 1, pp. 346–351.  ]
 Katschmartschik, W. "Permanent Exhalation (PA) in Wind Instruments Performing Technique (Problems of History and Physiology)". Diss. Kyiv State Music Academy (1995).  ]
 (Donetsk-Lviv: Donetsk State Musical Academy) (2009) Vol. 9, pp. 220–230. Katschmartschik, W. "Физиологический механизм перманентного выдоха" [The physiological mechanism of permanent exhalation. Музичне мистецтво Musical Art]
 Kynaston, P. Trent. "Circular Breathing". Studio Publ. Recordings 
 Nicolet, A. Studien zum Spielen Neuer Musik. Pro musica nova. Cologne: Gerig, 1973